The women's 49 kilograms competition at the 2022 World Weightlifting Championships was held on 5 and 6 December 2022.

Schedule

Medalists

Records

Results

References

Women's 49 kg
World Championships